Yoshitsune may refer to:
 Minamoto no Yoshitsune (1159–1189)
 Gikeiki, a Japanese chronicle, sometimes known in English by Helen Craig McCullough's translated title Yoshitsune
 Yoshitsune (TV series), a 2005 Japanese television drama series
 Kujō Yoshitsune (1169–1206)
 Takuya Sugi (born 1983), Japanese professional wrestler better known as Yoshitsune
 Yoshitsune, a character in manga/anime Air Gear